This is a list of Slovak billionaires based on an annual assessment of wealth and assets compiled and published by Forbes in 2022.

2022 Slovak billionaires list

See also
 The World's Billionaires
 List of countries by the number of billionaires

References

Slovak
net worth
 
Billionaires